Jakub Jurka (born 13 June 1999) is a Czech fencer. His grandfather Jaroslav Jurka was also a fencer who represented Czechoslovakia at the 1976 Summer Olympics and 1980 Summer Olympics.

He represented Czech Republic at the 2020 Summer Olympics which also marked his debut appearance at the Olympics. During the 2020 Summer Olympics, he competed in the men's épée event.

References 

1999 births
Living people
Czech male fencers
Fencers at the 2020 Summer Olympics
Olympic fencers of the Czech Republic
Sportspeople from Olomouc